Zhenning Buyei and Miao Autonomous County (usually referred to as "Zhenning County", commonly abbreviated as Zhenning; Buyei: Zenqninf Buxqyaix Buxyeeuz Ziqziqxianq) is an autonomous county under the administration of the prefecture-level city of Anshun, in the southwest of Guizhou Province, China.

History

In the 3rd century BC, Zhenning Buyei and Miao Autonomous County (Zhenning) was a part of an ancient political entity Yelang.

In 233, in the 11th year of Jianxing period of Shu Han (221–263), the county under the control of Puli Dazong.

In late Song dynasty, the powerful Mongol Empire, led by Genghis Khan, began their conquest of Song Empire. The Mongolian army occupied Zhenning and it came under the jurisdiction of Hehong Zhou. In 1351, in the 11th year of Zhizheng period of the Yuan dynasty (1271–1368), Hehong Prefecture was renamed "Zhenning Zhou" and belonged to Puding Circuit.

In 1385, in the ruling of Hongwu Emperor of the Ming dynasty (1368–1644), Zhenning came under the jurisdiction of Sichuan Buzhengshisi. Five years later, a military garrison named "Anzhuangwei" was founded in downtown Zhenning.

In 1671, in the reign of Kangxi Emperor of the Qing dynasty (1644–1911), Zhenning became an independent "Zhou" and under the administration of Anshun Prefecture.

In 1914, Zhenning Zhou was revoked and Zhenning County was set up.

On November 21, 1949, the Communists took over Zhenning. In 1956, it came under the jurisdiction of Qiannan Buyei and Miao Autonomous Prefecture. In 1958, Guanling was briefly merged into Zhenning County and then separated in 1961. On September 11, 1963, it became an autonomous county approved by the State Council of China. In 1964, it was under jurisdiction of Liuzhi Special District. In 1981, Zhenning Buyei and Miao Autonomous County came under the jurisdiction of Anshun.

Administrative divisions
After an adjustment of township-level administrative divisions of Zhenning Buyei and Miao Autonomous County on January 14, 2016, the county has four subdistricts, eight towns and three townships under its jurisdiction.

Geography
Zhenning Buyei and Miao Autonomous County is located in the southwest of Guizhou province. It borders Puding County and Liuzhi Special District in the north, Wangmo County and Zhenfeng County in the east and south, Xixiu District and Ziyun Miao and Buyei Autonomous County in the east, and Guanling Buyei and Miao Autonomous County in the west.

Climate

Rivers
There are 31 rivers and streams in Zhenning Buyei and Miao Autonomous County, which are tributaries of Dabang River and Qingshui River.
 
Zhenning River flows through the downtown county.

Lakes and reservoirs
There are three reservoirs in Zhenning Buyei and Miao Autonomous County: Wang'er River Reservoir, White Horse Reservoir, Guijiahu Reservoir and Red Flag Lake。

Mountains

Parks

Huancui Park is an urban park in Zhenning Buyei and Miao Autonomous County.

Economy
As of 2019, the GDP of Zhenning Buyei and Miao Autonomous County was 10.962 billion yuan, and the per capita GDP was 38162 yuan. Zhenning Buyei and Miao Autonomous County's economic engines are agriculture, animal husbandry, mining, paper industry, tourism, and plastic products industry.

Demographics

Population
As of 2019, the National Bureau of Statistics of the People's Republic of China estimates the county's population now to be 287,300. There are 23 ethnic groups living in Zhenning Buyei and Miao Autonomous County, including Han, Buyei, Miao and Gelao.

Language
Mandarin is the official language. The local people speak both Southwestern Mandarin and minority language.

Religion
The county government supports all religions. The local people mainly believe in Buddhism and Catholicism.

Education
There are one high school, nine middle schools, sixty-nine primary schools, and sixty-four kindergartens in Zhenning Buyei and Miao Autonomous County.

Transportation 
China National Highway 320, commonly abbreviated as "National Highway 320", runs through the county.

Zhensheng Expressway

Tourism
Tourism and related services are still developing in Zhenning Buyei and Miao Autonomous County. The county is known worldwide for Huangguoshu Waterfall, which attracts a large number of tourists. The county's most visited Buddhist temple is Nianfo Temple. The Red Flag Reservoir is a popular attraction. Major tourist destinations include Yelang Cave, Rhinoceros Cave and Shuangming Cave.

Notable people
Ren Zhengfei, entrepreneur, engineer and founder and CEO of Huawei Technologies Co., Ltd.

References

External links
Official website of Zhenning Government

 
County-level divisions of Guizhou
Bouyei autonomous counties
Miao autonomous counties